John Ssebaana Kizito (12 September 1934 - 3 July 2017) was a Ugandan businessman, economist and politician. He was the president of the Democratic Party (DP) in Uganda from 2005 to 2010. Kizito was a member of the University Council of Ndejje University. He was reported to be one of the wealthiest people in Uganda, having sizable holdings in real estate and insurance.

Background and education
Ssebaana was born in Mpande Village, Luweero District, in Uganda's Central Region on 12 September 1934. He attended Kings College Budo and was a graduate of Makerere University. In 1960, he graduated with a Master of Arts degree in economics from the University of Oregon in Eugene, Oregon in the U.S.

Career
Kizito'a political career began before Uganda became an independent country. He was a civil servant and politician in several of Uganda's eras of tyranny and political turmoil, including under Idi Amin, Milton Obote, and President Yoweri Museveni's National Resistance Movement government.

In 1960, he served as a national executive officer. Upon returning from the U.S. in October 1962, he became an investment executive at the Uganda Development Corporation, the holding company that managed all government-owned enterprises.

After independence, he was a member of the East African Legislative Assembly, an arm of the East African Community, from 1967 until 1977. From 1977 until 1980, he served as the chairman of the National Insurance Corporation. In 1980, he was elected a member of parliament for the Kampala South Constituency, winning 90 percent of the vote. He was the shadow minister of foreign affairs between 1981 until 1985 and was acting leader of the opposition in 1983.

He served as minister of cooperatives and marketing from 1985 until 1987, as minister of regional cooperation from 1987 until 1988, and as minister of housing and urban development from 1989 until 1991.

He was a member of the Constituent Assembly that wrote the 1995 Ugandan Constitution, representing the Makindye East Constituency. From 1994 to 1995, he served as chairman of the National Caucus of Democracy.

Between 1998 and 2006, he was twice elected mayor of Kampala, Uganda's capital city, replacing Nasser Sebaggala in 1999 and being replaced by Sebaggala in 2006.

Kizito was the Democratic Party's unsuccessful candidate in the 2006 presidential election.

Business
In 1982, John Ssebaana Kizito, together with a business associate, Joseph William Kiwanuka, established Uganda's first private (non-government) insurance company, Statewide Insurance Company (SWICO), for which Ssebaana served as Chairman of the Board and Kiwanuka serves as the Managing Director.

Death
Ssebaana died on 3 July 2017 at Nakasero Hospital, in Kampala, where he was admitted two weeks prior,  following a stroke.

See also
 List of political parties in Uganda
 Statewide Insurance Company
 Politics of Uganda
 List of wealthiest people in Uganda
 List of Insurance Companies in Uganda
 Ndejje University

References

External links

 Ssebaana Celebrates 80th Birthday (Luganda)

1934 births
2017 deaths
Democratic Party (Uganda) politicians
Ganda people
Government ministers of Uganda
Mayors of Kampala
Makerere University alumni
People from Luweero District
University of Oregon alumni